Bērze is a river of Latvia. It flows for 107 kilometres before emptying into the Svēte. Major tributaries include the Bikstupe, Sesava, Ālav, Līčupe, Līčupe and Gardene. Major settlements along the river include Zebrene, Biksti, Kaķenieki, Annenieki, Dobele, Bērze, Līvbērze.

See also
List of rivers of Latvia

Rivers of Latvia